Harpalus flavescens is a ground beetle in the Harpalinae subfamily that is common in Europe, Siberia, Central Asia and Northern Asia. In Central Asia it can be found only in Kazakhstan.

References

External links
Harpalus flavescens
Harpalus flavescens on Flickr

flavescens
Beetles of Europe
Beetles of Asia
Beetles described in 1783